Lotbinière-Frontenac is a provincial electoral district in the Chaudière-Appalaches region of Quebec, which elects members to the National Assembly of Quebec.  It consists of the entirety of Lotbinière Regional County Municipality and nearly all of Les Appalaches Regional County Municipality. It includes the municipalities of Thetford Mines, Saint-Apollinaire, Saint-Agapit, Saint-Gilles, Adstock, Laurier-Station, Sainte-Croix, East Broughton and Saint-Joseph-de-Coleraine.

It was created for the 2012 election from parts of the former Lotbinière and Frontenac electoral districts; Saint-Fortunat was also taken from Richmond electoral district.

Members of the National Assembly

Election results

|}

^ Change is from redistributed results. CAQ change is from ADQ.

References

External links
Information
 Elections Quebec

Maps
 2011 map (PDF)
2001–2011 changes to Lotbinière (Flash)
2001–2011 changes to Frontenac (Flash)
 Electoral map of Chaudière-Appalaches region
 Quebec electoral map, 2011

Quebec provincial electoral districts
Thetford Mines